The 1951 Northwestern Wildcats team represented Northwestern University during the 1951 Big Ten Conference football season. In their fifth year under head coach Bob Voigts, the Wildcats compiled a 5–4 record (2–4 in Big Ten, sixth), and were outscored 124 to 112.

Against Navy on October 20, Charlie Hren rushed for 218 yards to set a school record. It stood for eighteen years, until Mike Adamle shattered it with 316 yards against Wisconsin in 1969.

Schedule

References

Northwestern
Northwestern Wildcats football seasons
Northwestern Wildcats football